Juana Gallo is a 1961 Mexican drama film written and directed by Miguel Zacarías. It was entered into the 2nd Moscow International Film Festival.

Plot
The story takes place during the Mexican Revolution.  After Juana Gallo's (Maria Felix) father and boyfriend were executed by the government officials, Juana takes courage in response of her lost and rescues the man from the village that were taken as prisoners.  Juana breaks the stereotypes and lectures the man from the village and the soldiers, (now prisoners) of how Mexicans are killing other Mexicans just to protect a corrupt government.

Cast
In alphabetical order
 Luis Aguilar as Arturo Ceballos Rico
 Marina Camacho as Arturo's girl
 René Cardona
 María Félix as Ángela Ramos 'Juana Gallo'
 Sonia Infante
 José Alfredo Jiménez
 Ignacio López Tarso as Pioquinto
 Rita Macedo as Woman
 Christiane Martel
 Jorge Mistral as Guillermo Velarde
 Noé Murayama

References

External links
 

1961 films
1961 drama films
Mexican drama films
1960s Spanish-language films
Mexican Revolution films
1960s Mexican films